Androula Yiakoumetti is a Cypriot dialectologist based at the University of Cambridge. Her research focuses on Greek language and socio-cultural factors that influence language acquisition.

See also
 Bidialectism

References

Year of birth missing (living people)
Living people
Linguists at the University of Cambridge
Cypriot academics
Cypriot social scientists
Dialectologists
Hellenists
Place of birth missing (living people)